Wenvoe is a village, community and electoral ward between Barry and Cardiff in the Vale of Glamorgan, Wales. Nearby are the Wenvoe Transmitter near Twyn-yr-Odyn and the site of the former HTV Wales Television Centre at Culverhouse Cross which is now a housing estate. It is home to the Wenvoe Quarry and Wenvoe Castle Golf Club.

History
Maintaining a thriving farming community for centuries, Wenvoe, while still a farming village to an extent, has doubled in population in the last hundred years due to new housing developments.

The village originally developed around the parish church of St. Mary, which can be traced back to the twelfth century with the adjacent locality now being a conservation area. Wenvoe is recorded as having belonged to the De Sully, le Fleming and Malefaunt famililies in the later medieval periods. After being escheated to the crown the castle of Wenvoe belonged successively to the Thomas, Birt and Jenner families. Major development occurred in the 1770s but much of this was obliterated by a fire in 1910. Some medieval or earlier fortification is also known to have existed in the wooded hillside at Wrinstone.

On August 15, 1952, the Wenvoe transmitting station broadcast television to Wales for the first time.

Governance
An electoral ward with the same name exists. The total ward population taken at the 2011 census was 2,659, though in 2022 the neighbouring community of St Nicholas and Bonvilston was transferred to a new ward.

Landmarks and attractions

The village has a village shop with a post office, a parish church, primary school, hotel, a part-time library, barber and three village halls.

It is home to three pubs (two that have been in the village for hundreds of years – The Wenvoe Arms and The Horse & Jockey at nearby Twyn-yr-Odyn, both of which are protected buildings – and the more recent Walston Castle) and many acres of forestry and fields. There is another church at St Lythans. A village show is held every September at the Community Centre hosted by the village Scout Group.

It is a single stone Megalithic dolmen, built around 6,000 years ago as part of a chambered long barrow, during the Neolithic period.

The Tinkinswood burial chamber is about 3.5 km (2½ miles) north west of Wenvoe, near the village of St Nicholas), or about 6 km (3¾ miles) by road towards Bonvilston. Tinkinswood is more extensive than St Lythans, which it may have once resembled, and was constructed during the same period.

Between the St Lythans and Tinkinswood burial chambers lie Dyffryn Gardens, to whose estate both burial chambers once belonged.
Dyffryn Gardens is a collection of botanical gardens located near the village of St. Nicholas. They were selected by the British Tourism Association as one of the Top 100 gardens in the UK.

Notable people
 Robert Francis Jenner (1802-1860), High Sheriff of Glamorgan in 1827
 Alfred Herbert Jenner, rector of Wenvoe
 Colonel Charles Nassau Thomas (died April 1820), vice chamberlain to the Prince of Wales (later King George IV)
 Edmund Thomas (1633–1677), politician who sat in the House of Commons in 1654 and 1656 and sat in Cromwell's Upper House
 Sir Edmund Thomas (died 1723)
 Sir John Godfrey Thomas, sixth baronet of Wenvoe (died 1841)
 Sir Godfrey-Vignolles Thomas, 9th Baronet (1856–1919)
 Hugh Jenner, founder of Wenvoe Castle Golf Club
 Simon Cox, PGA European Tour golfer.

See also
Wenvoe Quarry
Wenvoe railway station
Wenvoe transmitting station
Wenvoe Tunnel

References

Further reading

External links
www.geography.co.uk : photos of Wenvoe and surrounding area
Wenvoe Online
Wenvoe Pétanque Club

Villages in the Vale of Glamorgan
Communities in the Vale of Glamorgan
Vale of Glamorgan electoral wards